Vikram Chand Mahajan (27 March 1933 – 11 August 2016) was an Indian politician.  He was elected to the Lok Sabha, the lower house of the Parliament of India  as a member of the Indian National Congress. He was the son of Mehr Chand Mahajan a former Chief Justice of the Supreme Court of India.

References

External links
Official biographical sketch in Parliament of India website
Vikram Chand Mahajan's obituary

1933 births
2016 deaths
Lok Sabha members from Himachal Pradesh
India MPs 1967–1970
India MPs 1971–1977
India MPs 1980–1984
Indian National Congress politicians